The Military Intelligence Corps (MIC) is one of the corps of the Sri Lanka Army.  It is responsible for gathering, analyzing and disseminating military intelligence and also for counter-intelligence and security.

Regular battalions 
1st Military Intelligence Corps
2nd Military Intelligence Corps
4th Military Intelligence Corps
5th Military Intelligence Corps

Volunteer battalions 

3rd (V) Military Intelligence Corps (Formed on 21 April 2004)
6th (V) Military Intelligence Corps (Formed on 14 January 2011)

Notable members
General Lionel Balagalle - former Commander of the Army and founder of the Military Intelligence Corps
Major General Laksiri Waduge RWP RSP VSV USP ndu - former Colonel commandant of the Military Intelligence Corps
Major General S.D. Thennakoon - former Colonel commandant of the Military Intelligence Corps
Major General H.K.G. Hendavitharana - former Chief of National Intelligence and Colonel commandant of the Military Intelligence Corps
Major General A.S.P. Zaheer - former Colonel commandant of the Military Intelligence Corps
Colonel Tuan Nizam Muthaliff  - former Commanding Officer of the 1st Military Intelligence Corps.
Colonel Tuan Rizli Meedin  - former Commanding Officer of the 1st Military Intelligence Corps.

Order of precedence

See also
Long Range Reconnaissance Patrol (Sri Lanka)
State Intelligence Service (Sri Lanka)
Intelligence Corps (United Kingdom)

External links and sources

 Sri Lanka Army
 Military Intelligence Corps

Military Intelligence Corps (Sri Lanka)
Nationstate regiments/corps of military intelligence
Military units and formations established in 1990